Nydahl is a surname. Notable people with the surname are as follows:

 Hannah Nydahl (1946–2007), Danish teacher of Tibetan Buddhism
 Ole Nydahl (born 1941), Danish teacher of Tibetan Buddhism
 Tomas Nydahl (born 1968), Swedish tennis player

Surnames of Scandinavian origin